The 1868-1869 North Carolina railroad bonds scandal took place in North Carolina after Milton S. Littlefield and George W. Swepson defrauded North Carolina of $4 million by issuing fraudulent bonds for a railroad project.

Scandal
From 1868 to 1869 the government of North Carolina authorized the issuing of $27.83 million worth of bonds and stocks to the benefit of 18 railway companies so they could furnish internal improvements for the state. In 1868 the Western North Carolina Railroad was taken over by Milton S. Littlefield and George W. Swepson through their purchase of a majority of its bonds. Littlefield was a lobbyist who had moved to the state from the North, while Swepson was a North Carolinian banker. Both men encouraged the Republican-controlled North Carolina General Assembly in its heavy spending on the railways. Swepson convinced Republican Governor William Woods Holden that state tax revenue would be sufficient to pay the interest owed for the bonds.

Under Littlefield's and Swepson's leadership, the Western North Carolina Railroad amassed a significant debt. They also participated in fraudulent stock subscriptions and released fake securities. Littlefield then left the state. By 1870 the state bond market had collapsed. Little railroad construction was actually done and North Carolina's government was left in heavy debt with its credit worthiness threatened.

Investigation 
Concerned about the state's financial reputation, in 1870 Conservatives and reform-oriented Republicans in the State Senate authorized the creation of three-person investigative committee under former governor Thomas Bragg to launch an inquiry into fraudulent activity with regards to the issuance of railway bonds. Holden believed the accusations of fraud were politically motivated, and other Senate Republicans limited the scope of the investigation. After Conservatives obtained a majority in the General Assembly in that year's elections, they appointed the Shipp Commission. The Shipp Commission uncovered widespread fraud and bribery related to the railway bonds issues.

Littlefield and Swepson were indicted, but never convicted. On February 9, 1871, the North Carolina House of Representatives adopted an article of impeachment against Governor Holden accusing him of conspiring with Swepson to defraud the state in the bonds scandal. It was ultimately not revealed to the public or tried in the State Senate for fear of implicating some state senators involved in the ongoing impeachment trial of Holden for actions taken during the Kirk–Holden war. Holden was never proven to have been involved in the scheme with the motive to enrich himself or otherwise personally benefit.

Aftermath
The scandal most likely hurt the government of North Carolina more than any other party. The state's railroad development from the bonds issued stagnated until the year 1880. In 1870 the state government purchased the Western North Carolina Railroad and subsequently leased it to other companies.

References

External links
Courts.gov Littlefield case record

North Carolina Railroad Bonds Scandal, 1868
Fraud in the United States
History of North Carolina
Railroad Bonds Scandal, 1868
Railroad bonds scandal
Crimes in North Carolina
1869 crimes in the United States